Mario Luis Rivera Sanchez (born ) is a Cuban male volleyball player. He was part of the Cuba men's national volleyball team. On club level he played for Pinar del Rio.

References

External links
 profile at FIVB.org

1982 births
Living people
Cuban men's volleyball players
Place of birth missing (living people)
Olympic volleyball players of Cuba
Volleyball players at the 2016 Summer Olympics
21st-century Cuban people